Joo Young-dai (born 20 September 1966) is a South Korean biathlete. He competed in the 20 km individual event at the 1988 Winter Olympics.

References

1966 births
Living people
South Korean male biathletes
Olympic biathletes of South Korea
Biathletes at the 1988 Winter Olympics
Dongguk University alumni
Place of birth missing (living people)
20th-century South Korean people